Dolichopterus is a genus of prehistoric sea scorpions, arthropods in the order Eurypterida. Fossils of Dolichopterus have been discovered in deposits ranging from Silurian to Devonian, and have been referred to several different species, some of them of dubious affinity to this genus.

Distribution
 
It lived in the shelf or epicontinental seas of the region where Avalonia, Baltica and Laurentia met during the Caledonian orogeny; its fossils have been found in modern-day North America and the Baltic region.

Description
Dolichopteridae, which lived in the Silurian and Devonian periods, had outer surfaces that were either smooth with pustules and semilunar scales. Their compound eyes were arcuate and located anteriorly on the prosoma (head). Their abdomens had epimers (lateral projections). The telson (the posteriormost division of the body) was lanceolate. Their chelicerae were small, and the first three pairs of walking lags were stout, with powerful spines. The last pair of walking lags had supplementary lobes, while the swimming lags had the last joint enlarged, as part of the paddle. The male genital appendage was long.

Dolichopterus is distinguishable by its nearly smooth outer surface; its subquadrate prosoma (head), and the slightly serrated margins on the distal joints and lobes of the swimming legs.

See also
 List of eurypterids

References

Eurypteroidea
Prehistoric chelicerate genera
Silurian eurypterids
Fossils of Canada
Bertie Formation
Eurypterids of Europe
Eurypterids of North America
Fossil taxa described in 1859